Missouri, Iowa & Nebraska Railway Co. Depot-Weldon, also known as Weldon Depot, is a historic structure located in Weldon, Iowa, United States.  The Missouri, Iowa, and Nebraska Railway Company (MI&N) was established in 1870 with the merger of the Alexandria and Nebraska City Railroad Company and the Iowa Southern Railway under the direction of Francis M. Drake.  The MI&N decided to extend the line from Corydon, Iowa to Van Wert.  J.P. Kline sold the railroad  of farmland on which the town of Weldon was founded.  The railroad began construction of the Weldon Depot in 1880, the same year the town was laid out.  The depot was completed the following year.  The MI&N was reorganized in 1886 as the Keokuk & Western Railroad.  They operated the rail line through Weldon until 1901 when it became part of the Chicago, Burlington & Quincy Railroad.  Passenger service continued in Weldon until December 1945.  The last freight train went through the station in January 1946.  The tracks were torn out when the railroad ceased service on the line.  The depot was given to the town of Weldon, which maintains it.  It was added to the National Register of Historic Places in 1991.

The depot is a single-story, frame structure the measures .  The building's original foundation was made up of railroad tie pilings set in the ground.  It was replaced in 1989.  The exterior walls are composed of vertical barn board and batten siding.  It is capped with a gable roof, with wooden brackets under the eaves.

References

Railway stations in the United States opened in 1881
Railway stations closed in 1946
Former Chicago, Burlington and Quincy Railroad stations
Railway stations on the National Register of Historic Places in Iowa
Former railway stations in Iowa
Transportation buildings and structures in Decatur County, Iowa
National Register of Historic Places in Decatur County, Iowa
1881 establishments in Iowa